General Townsend may refer to:

Edward D. Townsend (1817–1893), Union Army brigadier general and brevet major general
Franklin Townsend (1821–1898), Adjutant General of New York
Frederick Townsend (1825–1897), Union Army brevet brigadier general
Guy M. Townsend (1920–2011), U.S. Air Force brigadier general
Ralph D. Townsend (fl. 1950s–1990s), Idaho Air National Guard brigadier general
Stephen J. Townsend (born 1959), U.S. Army four-star general

See also
General Townshend (disambiguation)